The 2006 New York Dragons season was the 11th season for the franchise. They looked to make the playoffs again after finishing 2005 with a 10–6 record. They went 10–6 and made the playoffs.

Schedule

Playoff Schedule

New York Dragons
New York Dragons seasons